The Boston Pride are a professional women's ice hockey team based in Boston, Massachusetts. They are one of the four charter franchises of the Premier Hockey Federation (PHF), formerly the National Women's Hockey League (NWHL; 2015–2021). The Pride play at Warrior Ice Arena, which is also the practice facility for the Boston Bruins of the NHL. They won the inaugural Isobel Cup in 2016 and became the first professional women's ice hockey team to win three championship titles when they claimed consecutive victories in 2021 and 2022.

History

First seasons
The Pride were announced as one of the four founding teams in the National Women's Hockey League, the first women's hockey league in North America to pay its players a salary, to begin play in the 2015–16 season. In May 2015, the Pride announced the hiring of Bobby Jay as their head coach. Jay was previously an assistant coach for the silver medal-winning 2014 U.S. Women's Olympic Team, and on the coaching staff of the U.S. Women's National Team at the IIHF Women's World Championships in 2012 and 2013, and the Four Nations Cup in 2011, 2012, and 2013. The team announced its inaugural season would play home games at the Bright-Landry Hockey Center at Harvard University in the Allston neighborhood of Boston. In June 2015, Amanda Pelkey became the first player to sign a player contract with the Pride.

The team played their first game with a 4–1 victory over the Buffalo Beauts. Hilary Knight scored the first goal in franchise history and would also record the first multi-goal game in NWHL history. The Pride's first win was recorded by Brittany Ott, simultaneously becoming the first American-born goaltender to win an NWHL regular season game. During a 5–3 road win against the Buffalo Beauts, Brianna Decker scored the first hat-trick in NWHL history. In November 2015, Briana Decker and Hilary Knight were named co-captains of the Pride.

On December 31, 2015, the Boston Pride played the Les Canadiennes de Montréal of the Canadian Women's Hockey League (CWHL) to a 1–1 tie in the 2016 Outdoor Women's Classic at Gillette Stadium in Foxborough, Massachusetts, which took place the day before the 2016 NHL Winter Classic. It was the first outdoor professional women's hockey, the first women's game sanctioned by the NHL, and the only game ever played between NWHL and CWHL team. In the second period of the game, Denna Laing crashed into the boards and suffered a career ending injury. A rally of support resulted in funds raised for the Denna Laing Foundation. At the end of the season, Laing was awarded the NWHL's Foundation Award and the Perseverance Award, which was later named after her.

The Pride finished the league's inaugural season with the best record, earning the top seed in the Isobel Cup playoffs. The team then swept both the semifinals and finals over the New York Riveters and Buffalo Beauts, respectively. Decker was named the season's Most Valuable Player and Knight was the top scorer.

For their second season, the team moved their home games to Warrior Ice Arena, the practice arena of the NHL's Boston Bruins, in the Boston neighborhood of Brighton. On April 28, 2016, the Pride acquired the rights to Alex Carpenter, the first overall pick in the 2015 NWHL Draft, from the New York Riveters for rights to Miye D'Oench, the Pride's 2015 fourth round pick. On February 2, 2017, the team traded Zoe Hickel to Connecticut Whale for their first pick in the 2017 NWHL Draft. The Pride led the league by a large margin, earning a 16–1–0 record over 17 games. The Pride then lost to the Buffalo Beauts in the Isobel Cup final. Decker was named the NWHL's Most Valuable Player for the second consecutive season and also led the league in scoring.

Team turnover
The team had several personnel changes prior to the 2017–18 season, including a new head coach in Thomas Pöck, and lost seven players for the season in preparation for their participation in the 2018 Winter Olympics, including Carpenter, Decker, and Knight. Additionally, many of the NWHL's players opted to play in the CWHL, as the league had begun offering player stipends and the NWHL had made an up-to-50% cut to player pay during the previous season. Jillian Dempsey was then named the next team captain. After two seasons, in which the Pride finished regular season in first place, played in the Isobel Cup finals, the Pride finished in third place. The Pride ultimately lost to the Buffalo Beauts in the first round semifinal game and failed to make the Isobel Cup finals for the first time.

On May 30, 2018, Paul Mara was named head coach for the 2018–19 season and inaugural Pride member Marissa Gedman retired from playing to join the staff as an assistant coach. The Pride again finished third during the regular season and lost in the semifinal game to Buffalo. Johnny McInnis was hired as an assistant coach for the Pride in the 2020–21 season.

Under independent ownership
In September 2019, the league announced the Boston Pride had been purchased by a group of investors led by Miles Arnone. On January 26, 2020, Dempsey became the first player in league history to reach 100 career points, including playoffs. She reached the century mark with an assist in a win versus the Minnesota Whitecaps. The Pride won their third regular season title with a 23–1–0 record and qualified for the 2020 Isobel Cup final against the defending champion Minnesota Whitecaps. However, the championship was initially postponed and then cancelled as the COVID-19 pandemic escalated causing limitations for social distancing and traveling. Dempsey was league's the top scorer and was named the NWHL's co-Most Valuable Player with Allie Thunstrom of Minnesota. In September 2020, Logan International Airport unveiled a pair of championship banners for the Pride's 2016 Isobel Cup win and their 2019–20 regular season first-place finish. The Pride became the first women's sports team from Boston to have their banners hung in the airport, alongside the already-present men's Boston Bruins, Boston Celtics, New England Patriots, and Boston Red Sox.

Owing to the ongoing COVID-19 pandemic, the NWHL announced a two-week, single-site season to be played at Herb Brooks Arena in Lake Placid, New York, from January 23 to February 5, 2021. The Riveters were forced to withdraw early due to too many positive cases of COVID-19, leading to a schedule alteration with the Pride and the Beauts playing each other in a three-game series to determine the fourth seed, which the Pride won. The single-site season was curtailed prior to the playoffs due to an excessive outbreak of COVID-19 among all teams and personnel in Lake Placid. The postseason was rescheduled for March 26 and 27 at the Pride's home arena in Brighton. The Pride then defeated the top seeded Toronto Six before winning their second Isobel Cup by defeating the Minnesota Whitecaps 4–3 in the championship game.

On March 10, 2022, the Pride and PHF announced that Willie O'Ree had joined the team's ownership group.

The Pride finished the 2021–22 season as the #3 seed in the playoffs.  Boston outscored the Buffalo Beauts and Toronto Six by a combined 11–1 margin en route to the Championship game against the Connecticut Whale. On March 28, 2022, the Pride repeated as PHF champions beating the Whale 3–2. Taylor Wenczkowski scored the Isobel Cup-winning goal for the second year in a row and was named MVP of the Isobel Cup playoffs.

Season-by-season records

Note: In the 2021–22 season, the NWHL rebranded as the Premier Hockey Federation (PHF) and used a new points system for league standings in which regulation wins counted for 3 points. Overtime wins still counted as 2 points and overtime losses remained worth 1 point, as in prior seasons.

Media
In November 2015, it was announced that all Pride home games would be broadcast live on NESN. During the 2019–20 and 2020-2021 season, all NWHL games were broadcast live on Twitch. Starting in the 2021–22 season, all PHF games were broadcast on ESPN+ in the United States and TSN in Canada.

Team

Current roster

Coaching staff and team personnel
 Head coach: Paul Mara
 Assistant coach: Marissa Gedman
 Assistant coach: Courtney Sheary
 Athletic trainer: Jerry Foster
 Equipment manager: Dave Souza

Team captains   
 Brianna Decker & Hilary Knight, 2015–2017
 Jillian Dempsey, 2018–present

Head coaches 
Bobby Jay, 2015–2017
 Thomas Pöck, 2017–18
 Paul Mara, 2018–present

General managers  
 Hayley Moore, 2015–2017
 Karilyn Pilch, 2019–2021
 Danielle Larouco , 2021–22
 Maddie Rigsby, 2022–present

Team Presidents  
 Hayley Moore, 2017–2021
 Colleen Coyne, 2021–present

Draft history

2015 NWHL Draft

The following were the Pride's selections from the 2015 NWHL Draft of college ice hockey players in their junior year, held on June 20, 2015 in Boston. Drafted players who did not sign with the organization that selected them could enter free-agency after completing their senior year.

Kendall Coyne of the Northeastern Huskies women's ice hockey program was the first player ever drafted by the Boston Pride, selected in the first round, third overall in 2015.

Awards and honors

PHF/NWHL Awards
Most Valuable Player
 2016 – Brianna Decker
 2017 – Brianna Decker
 2020 – Jillian Dempsey (co-MVP with Allie Thunstrom of the Minnesota Whitecaps)
Goaltender of the Year
 2016 – Brittany Ott
 2020 – Lovisa Selander
Defender of the Year
 2016 – Gigi Marvin
 2020 – Kaleigh Fratkin
 2021 – Kaleigh Fratkin
Scoring Champion
 2016 – Hilary Knight
 2017 – Brianna Decker
 2020 – Jillian Dempsey
Playoff MVP
 2022 – Taylor Wenczkowski
Denna Liang Award
2016 – Denna Laing (called the 2016 Perseverance Award)
2018 – Jillian Dempsey
2019 – Jillian Dempsey 
Foundation Award
 2016  – Denna Laing
 2017 – Alyssa Gagliardi
 2018 – Lexi Bender
 2019 – Mallory Souliotis
 2020 – Lexi Bender
 2021 – Mallory Souliotis
 2022 – Jenna Rheault

Other
Fans' Three Stars of the Season
 2021 – Mallory Souliotis

Franchise milestones

References

External links

 

Boston Pride
Pride
Ice hockey clubs established in 2015
Premier Hockey Federation teams
Women's ice hockey teams in the United States
2015 establishments in Massachusetts